The 2017 Notre Dame Fighting Irish men's soccer team will represent University of Notre Dame during the 2017 NCAA Division I men's soccer season. It will be the program's 40th season. It will be the program's 5th season competing in the Atlantic Coast Conference.  The Fighting Irish will be led by head coach Bobby Clark, in his seventeenth year.

Roster

Source:

Prior to the season the Irish named three captains: Chris Hubbard, Matt Habrowski, and Jon Gallagher.

Coaching staff

Source:

Schedule
Source 

|-
!colspan=6 style=";"| Exhibition
|-

|-
!colspan=6 style=""| Regular Season

|-
!colspan=6 style=";"| ACC Tournament

|-
!colspan=6 style=";"| NCAA Tournament

Awards and honors

Rankings

MLS Draft 
The following members of the 2017 Notre Dame Fighting Irish men's soccer team were selected in the 2018 MLS SuperDraft.

References

Notre Dame Fighting Irish
Notre Dame Fighting Irish men's soccer seasons
Notre Dame Fighting Irish, Soccer
Notre Dame Fighting Irish
Notre Dame Fighting Irish